Francisco Higino Craveiro Lopes  (12 April 1894 – 2 September 1964) was a Portuguese Air Force officer and politician who served as the 12th president of Portugal from 1951 to 1958.

Early life and career 
Born in Lisbon, he was a son of João Carlos Craveiro Lopes, Portuguese army general and 122nd Governor-General of Portuguese India (1929–1936) and his wife Júlia Clotilde Cristiano Salinas.

He concluded his Colégio Militar studies by 1911, having then entered the Escola Politécnica de Lisboa, in the same year he joined a cavalry regiment. He succeeded his father as the 123rd General Governor of Portuguese India (1936–1938).

Presidency 
Prime Minister António de Oliveira Salazar chose Craveiro Lopes as the regime's presidential candidate in 1951 to succeed the late Óscar Carmona. Initially, he was to run in what would have been only the second contested election of the Estado Novo, when naval officer Manuel Quintão Meireles filed to run against him. However, Quintão Meireles withdrew before election day, and Craveiro Lopes was elected unopposed.

Under the Constitution, the president was vested with near-dictatorial powers. In practice, Carmona had mostly turned over the government to Salazar. However, Craveiro Lopes was not willing to give Salazar the free hand that Carmona had given him. Despite this, he did not go as far as to dismiss Salazar; for all intents and purposes, the president's power to sack the prime minister was the only check on Salazar's power.

Nevertheless, Salazar picked the seemingly more pliant naval minister, Américo Tomás, as the regime's candidate in 1958.  The Democratic Opposition then invited Craveiro Lopes to be their candidate, but he knew he stood no chance of winning and refused. The regime, however, as compensation promoted him to Marshal. He was involved in the failed military attempt to overthrow Salazar in 1961, led by the Defence Minister Júlio Botelho Moniz.

He died in Lisbon on 2 September 1964.

State visits 
 List of international presidential trips made by Francisco Craveiro Lopes

National honours
:
Sash of the Three Orders
Grand Cross of the Military Order of Aviz
Grand Officer of the Military Order of Aviz
Officer of the Military Order of Aviz
 Commander of the Order of Christ
Knight of the Order of the Tower and Sword
Grand Collar of the Order of the Tower and Sword
Victory Medal
Exemplary Behavior Medal
Medal of Military Merit
Medalha de Cruz de Guerra

Foreign honours
:
Grand Cross of the Order of Cisneros 
Grand Collar of the Imperial Order of the Yoke and Arrows
: Grand Cross of the Legion of Honour
: Grand Cross of the Order of the Holy Sepulchre of Jerusalem
:
Grand Cross of the Order pro Merito Melitensi
Bailiff Grand Cross of Honour and Devotion of the Sovereign Military Order of Malta
 Greece: Grand Cross of the Order of the Redeemer
:
Grand Cross of the Order of Military Merit
Grand Cross of the Order of Naval Merit
Grand Cross of the Order of Aeronautical Merit
: Grand Cross of the National Order of the Cedar
:
Royal Victorian Chain
Honorary Grand Cross of the Order of the Bath(GCB)
: Grand Cross of the Order of Merit of Duarte, Sánchez and Mella
: Grand Cordon of the Order of Leopold
: Grand Cordon of the Order of the Liberator

Family
He married Berta Ribeiro Artur (Lisbon, Pena, 15 October 1899 – Lisbon, Santa Maria de Belém, 5 July 1958), natural daughter of Engineer Sezinando Ribeiro Artur (Lisbon, 1875 – Lourenço Marques, 1918) by Maria Clara Pereira, by whom he had four children.

References

Craveiro Lopes. presidencia.pt

1894 births
1964 deaths
People from Lisbon
Portuguese military officers
Presidents of Portugal
Recipients of the Order of the Tower and Sword
Recipients of the Order pro Merito Melitensi
Honorary Knights Grand Cross of the Order of the Bath
Marshals of the air force
National Union (Portugal) politicians
Governors-General of Portuguese India
Field marshals of Portugal
19th-century Portuguese people
20th-century Portuguese politicians